Cercopimorpha is a genus of moths in the subfamily Arctiinae. The genus was described by Arthur Gardiner Butler in 1876.

Species
 Cercopimorpha dolens (Schaus, 1905)
 Cercopimorpha hoffmanni Zerny, 1931
 Cercopimorpha homopteridia Butler, 1876
 Cercopimorpha meterythra Hampson, 1898
 Cercopimorpha postflavida (Rothschild, 1912)
 Cercopimorpha sylva Schaus, 1920
 Cercopimorpha tetragonia Hampson, 1898

Selected former species
 Cercopimorpha complexa Gaede, 1926

References

Arctiinae